The Tin Flute is a 1983 Canadian drama film directed by Claude Fournier and based on the Gabrielle Roy novel of the same name. 

The film was co-produced by the National Film Board of Canada's French-language branch, Ciné St-Henri Inc., and Société Radio-Canada, the French-language branch of the Canadian Broadcasting Corporation.

It was entered into the 13th Moscow International Film Festival. The film was selected as the Canadian entry for the Best Foreign Language Film at the 56th Academy Awards, but it was not accepted as a nominee.

Cast
  as Florentine Lacasse
 Pierre Chagnon as Jean
 Michel Forget as Azarius Lacasse
 Marilyn Lightstone as Rose-Anna Lacasse
 Charlotte Laurier as Yvonne
 Thuryn Pranke as Philippe
 Thomas Hellman as Daniel
 Martin Neufeld as Emmanuel
 Linda Sorgini as Marguerite
 Dennis O'Connor as Phil Morin
 Howard Ryshpan as Docteur Katz

See also
 List of submissions to the 56th Academy Awards for Best Foreign Language Film
 List of Canadian submissions for the Academy Award for Best Foreign Language Film

References

External links
 

1983 films
1983 drama films
Canadian drama films
Films based on Canadian novels
Films directed by Claude Fournier
Ici Radio-Canada Télé original programming
National Film Board of Canada films
Films set in Montreal
Films scored by François Dompierre
French-language Canadian films
1980s Canadian films